Bajjala Walawwe Gretien Ananda Abeykoon (15 March 1957 – 29 December 2010), also as Gration Ananda or Greshan Ananda, was a Sri Lankan singer, composer, songwriter and a lyricist. Considered as the best Sinhalese film score musician to have emerged in the country since the veteran artist the Late H.R. Jothipala, Ananda sang for more than 400 films with a musical career that spanned nearly three decades.

He died at the age of 53 while receiving treatments at National Hospital of Sri Lanka, Colombo.

Personal life
He was born on 15 March 1957 to a family immersed in music. His father Bajjala Walawwe Shelton Abeykoon was a police officer and mother Bernadette Bernadine Jayawardena Amadoru, was a music teacher and a pianist. His grand father Brigadier Charley Jayawardena Amador was a renowned musician who served in the British Army. He spent his early childhood in Kandy, after he moved to hometown Tangalle for primary education. The family had to move frequently as the father's job was transferred from time to time, where he attended to as many as 10 schools. He first went to Little Flower Convent in Tangalle and then to St.Mathew College Dematagoda. Then he completed Advanced Level Examination from Saint Joseph's College, Colombo.

He was a devoted Catholic, where he never missed a Tuesday mass at St Anthony's Church, Kochchikade in Colombo. He polished his music ability as a chorister of All Saints' Church in Borella by Reverend Father John Herath OMI.

As a result of a romantic relationship, Ananda married his longtime partner Srima Abeykoon on January 11, 1985, at St. Cecilia's Church, Colombo. The couple  has one daughter, Dulanjalee Chathurya and one son, Mario Angelo. His son Mario Ananda was born on 12 May 1991 and completed education from father's school, St.Joseph College. He started music career after Gratien's death to continue his legacy. In October 2020, his daughter Dulanjali released her maiden song Nidahase with a music video.

Career

As a singer
His music education took place in his own home, since his mother was a music teacher, he was able to associate various musical instruments at his home. When he turns five, he will be able to play the mouth organ wonderfully. Ananda started to play mouth organ since the age of 3. His music ability was first identified by school music teacher Rev.Father John Herath, where Ananda started to play trumpet and then keyboard. He practiced piano under Lal Perera and Claud Fernando. Then he graduated from Royal College of Music, London with a Diploma in Western Music.

In 1976, Ananda started to play under different bands most notably Stanley Perera's Fortunes, which became his turning point. During that time, he met musician Sarath Dassanayake and joined his orchestra to play guitar. Within the orchestra, his first played the guitar for H.R. Jothipala's Taj Mahalak song. With his extreme musical talent, he was elevated to the position of Assistant Music Director in the orchestra. Under Sarath Dasanayake and Mervin Perera, he started to learn classical Eastern Music.

Later, he worked as the Lead guitarist for many bands including Dreamers, Earnest and the Combo, Superset and Seac for many years. He was also invited to play as a guitarist for Victor Rathnayake's SA Concert. Sanath Gunathilaka was the most successful actor to match Gretien's voice. Ananda first rendered his voice to Gunathilaka's acting in Yasapalitha Nanayakkara's Newatha Hamuwemu. Since then, the Sanath-Greshan combination has created a huge number of film songs. It is also significant that all of these songs are extremely popular.

He released his first cassette in 1978. Ananda was able to sing together with Neela Wickramasinghe for a disc in 1978. His first LP Record contained four songs and all songs had been composed musically by Gration himself. With that song Atha Duraka Detha Pawela, Ananda was invited to sing as a playback singer for films. His maiden playback singing came through Sena Samarasinghe's film Mal Kekulu through the duet Bindu Bindu Kandulu Gala with Shyami Fonseka. After the film, he continued his enormous contribution to Sinhala cinema, where he sang for more than 400 films.

In 2004, he celebrated 25 years in music with a concert Ananda Rathriya at the BMICH on 25 September at 6.00 pm. The DVD of the concert was released in 2005 with the brand Torana Music Box. The DVD comprises 20 popular songs sung by Ananda.

His final song album was Desithaka Gee produced in year 2007 with 12 new songs. In 2009, he launched a CD at the Namel Malini Punchi Theatre on 14 February at 9 am. The CD comprises 23 songs sung at Ananda Rathriya and his son Mario also launched Gayana Gayum made up of 16 tracks on the same day.

Music direction
He started to compose music for songs Etha Duraka Etha Pawela by himself and Neela Wickramasinghe and Tedini Viraja by Edward Jayakody. Both songs became popular hits, where K.A.W Perera invited Ananda to direct music for his film Durga. With that film, he directed music for about 16 films such as Dhawala Pushpaya, Randenigala Singhaya, Sinha Patawu, Hai Master and Hitha Honda Gaheniyak.

He also composed music for television serials. His first tele-drama music came through Gamana and Premada Weadi, both by K.A.W Perera.

As a lyricist
Ananda composed melodies for his fellow artistes, some of them became very popular. Some of his lyrics include Mage Punchi Kumari and Mage Athita Diviya  (Wrote by great actor Sanath Gunathilake) for Milton Mallawarachchi, Aradhana Nethu Chaya and Sudu Rosa Mal for Priya Suriyasena, Mangalle Mal for Chandralekha Perera, Sandalatha for Sanath Nandasiri.

Legacy
For his enormous contribution to Sri Lankan cinema and music industry, he was awarded with a special award by the Pope Benedict in Vatican City in 2006.
Sarasaviya Award for the Best Film Director 1988 – nominated (Durga).
Sarasaviya Award for the Best Male Vocalist 1994 – won (Raja-Daruwo).
Sarasaviya Award for the Best Male Vocalist 2007 – won (Anjalika).
OCIC SIGNEES International Award – won (for contribution to Sri Lankan field of Art).

Illness and death
On 22 December 2010, Ananda was hospitalized to receive treatments for a number of illnesses including liver failure.

In December 2010, Ananda died at the age of 53 while taking medical assistance at the Colombo National Hospital. He was cremated at the Borella Cemetery. Hospital confirmed that, he died at 6.45 am while receiving treatment at the Intensive Care Unit (ICU).

Playback singing filmography

Track listing

Solo tracks

Adara Seenuwa
Adari Sagari Ma Hade Mandire
Akasha Gangawe Pawee Gena
Anupama Senehe
Bale Punchi Kale Wage
Bindu Bindu Kandulu Gala
Chandana Allen Nala (Originally sung by H.R. Jothipala)
Datha Dilena Bandi Walalu
Dathe Ran Muthu
Dawadi Thilina Ran Mini Muthu
Deege Bara Bage
Didulana Podi Ran Tharuwak
Dilidune Daruwane
Ea Geetha Rawe
Ea Kale Wage Na Adare
Eeye Men Oba
Ganga Nadiye Hamuwu
Gangule Iwure
Gata Pichcha Suwandata
Geetha Gaya (Supem Pa)
Hama Hawasaka Ma
Hawasata Paya
Hima Kandu Yahane
His Veedo Bandun
Hithumathe Jeewithe
Jayasri We Kumariye
Jeewithayata Maga Penwa
Kalaya Galana Me Nadiye
Kawadada Hitha Hinahenne
Kowula Kohedo (his last song)
Kreedakayo Tharagaye Yedena
Kumariye Oba Langa Ma
Lassana Midule
Ma Awe Pawasannai
Ma Dayabara Priyawiye (Originally sung by Milton Mallawarachchi)
Ma Ha Ae Suratha Dara
Ma Upanna Deshayai
Mage Jeewithaye Pa Sandu Se
Mage Loke Sihine Oba We
Mahada Sanasu Preme
Mal Sinaha Pawe (I Love You)
Mama Raga Thala
Mangalle Mal Mala Dala
Maranaye Dora Aree
Mayawa Randawu Sinawe
Me Punchi Hithakata
Me Seetha Ra Yamaye
Mee Bindu Gala Gala Thibunu
Minisiyawe Mahima Thawa
Mulu Lowa Mawitha Kalo
Muwa Hasaral Mawuye
Nawa Aare As Bandum Enne
Nethu Piya Wasa
Pata Pata Suwanda Hamana
Pera Wasanthaya
Pin Pata Pipi Mala
Punchi Punchi Punchi Patawune Ma
Ra Thun Yame Palu
Raja Madure Ipadeela
Rallen Ralla Wellen Wella
Ranin Mala
Rayak Dawalak Nopeni Nodani
Sammani Duwani
Sanda Langa Danga Kala
Sanda Se Nisha Thalawe
Sanda Seethalada
Sanda Yame Paya Tharu Uyane
Sandu Sagawela
Sangawee Yannata Bari Wu
Sara Sande Sina Sele (Originally sung by H.R. Jothipala)
Sathutin Nidalle
Senehasa Pibidi
Senehe Irak Patha
Sihina Ahase Wasanthe (solo slow)
Sihinayaki Jeewithe
Sihiniga Nalawenna
Sithata Ganna Wera Wadanna
Sithehi Yamak Nam
Sithumi Duwe Visura Puthe
Snehaye Handa Jesuni
Sonduru Rayaka Yame
Suhada Madura Preme
Sunil Wala Salu Pili Patala (Originally sung by H.R. Jothipala)
Sura Anganawo Ra Ahase Paya
Sura Lowa Madale Geetha Gayanne
Tharu Yaye Athin Athata
Tharuwak Pipi Ra
Vil Jale Pipena Nelumata
Wareka Sada Sulagak Wagei

Duets

Ada Nathuwada Awi Mana – with Anjalin Gunathilaka
Ada Vinode Sapa Soyala – with Anjalin Gunathilaka
Adara Geetha Gayala – with Kalawathee
Adare Nam Pothe – with Champa Kalhari 
Adaredo Dasin Pawasa Giye – with Shyami Fonseka
Al Hene Pal Rakiddi – with G.S.B. Rani Perera
Ananda We Jeewithe – with Nathasha Perera
Amma Amma - with Milton Mallawarachchi
Ananda Wena - with Milton Mallawarachchi, Latha Walpola and Anjalin Gunathilaka
Api Santhosen Inne – with Milton Perera 
Asha Nura Sanda Paya – with Mariyasel Gunathilaka
Ashawe Ashawe Paya – with H.R. Jothipala 
Atha Duraka Desa Pawela – with Neela Wickramasinghe
Awa Awa Adare Soyala – with Chandraleka Perera
Ayachana Obe Netha Randu Sithuwame
Cheriyo Kiyala Me – with Freddie Silva
Dase Obe Senehe Mawewi – with Uresha Ravihari
Gee Rasa Denna – with Chandrika Siriwardena
Hima Kumariye – with Nathasha Perera 
Hima Renu Watena – with Latha Walpola
Hinahedo Jala Rakusa – with H.R. Jothipala
Jeewithe Mal Supipunu Mawathe – with Dayan Witharana
La Neela Akashaye – with Anjalin Gunathilaka
Ma Ha Lanwela – with Milton Mallawarachchi
Ma Mal Kumarayo – with Anjalin Gunathilaka
Madura Prema Nimnaye – with Sujatha Aththanayaka
Mage Adare Vimane – with Uresha Ravihari
Mal Mee Man Math (Ding Dong Oh Baby) – with Chandrika Siriwardena
Mal Loke Pavi Pavi Yawi - with Milton Mallawarachchi
Mal Muthulel Hiripoda Warusawaka – with Malani Bulathsinhala
Mala Gira Jodu Sadi – with Chandraleka Perera 
Malliye - with H.R. Jothipala
Manaliyak Sanda Wage – with Anjalin Gunathilaka
Me Gee Sandawe – with Kumari Munasinghe
Mey Gangaadhare - with Milton Mallawarachchi and Latha Walpola
Nil Nuwan Sandalle – with Nirosha Virajini
Nilla Madin Yan Adara – with Maya Damayanthi
Nindedi Rathri Sihine – with Chandrika Siriwardena
Oba Ewidin - with Uresha Ravihari
Obage Denethin Galai Adare – with Latha Walpola
Pawee Pawee Seetha Maruthe – with Anjalin Gunathilaka
Payana Sanda Kirane – with Latha Walpola
Pem Loke Pavi Pavi Yawi – with Milton Mallawarachchi 
Pipena Male Suwanda Dane – with Latha Walpola
Punchi Ranpata Samanalayo – with Nathasha Perera
Rosa Mal Wimanaye – with Chandrika Siriwardena
Sagare Wageya Mage – with Uresha Ravihari
Sansara Gee Rawaye – with Latha Walpola
Sihina Lathaviya Sathapena Dase – with Neela Wickramasinghe
Sinaha Kandulu – with H.R. Jothipala
Sihina Ahase Wasanthe - with H.R. Jothipala and Anjalin Gunathilaka
Sudu Muthulal Sihine – with Latha Walpola
Thisara Vile – with Samitha Mudunkotuwa
Udarata Sinhala Porane – with W.D. Amaradewa
Wadath Agei Hadath Penei – with Freddie Silva

References

External links
Mario Ananda: Here comes the son
'Sunila Sara' : 23 years of creations on stage
The velvety voice of Priya Suriyasena
Gration Ananda songs
Mario Anandaneeya Geetha Rathriya
Gration Ananda Sinhala Mp3 Songs

1957 births
2010 deaths
People from Galle
20th-century Sri Lankan male singers
Sinhalese singers
Sri Lankan Roman Catholics